Kismat is a 1995 Indian Hindi-language action thriller film directed by Harmesh Malhotra. It stars Govinda and Mamta Kulkarni.

Plot
Rajan (Kabir Bedi) gets Geeta (Raakhee) pregnant and wants her to get an abortion, but Geeta refuses, and gives birth to a baby boy and leaves him in an orphanage. Fate plays a strange trick and the baby is adopted by Geeta and her new husband ACP Anand (Suresh Oberoi), who are led to believe that the child is Anand's. Rajan goes abroad and loses touch with Geeta. Things start to heat up when the baby, all grown up, starts working with Rajan, who has now returned from abroad, and taken to crime.

Cast
 Raakhee as Geeta
 Govinda as Ajay
 Mamta Kulkarni as Madhu
 Kabir Bedi as Rajan
 Suresh Oberoi as ACP Anand
 Asrani as	Banke
 Kunika as	Banke's Wife
 Aparajita as Anand's Wife
 Bob Christo as Charlie
 A. K. Hangal as Nanaji

Soundtrack
The music was composed by Anand–Milind.

References

External links

1990s Hindi-language films
1995 films
Films scored by Anand–Milind
Films directed by Harmesh Malhotra